Grief is a novel by American author Andrew Holleran, published in 2006. The novel takes place in Washington D.C., following the personal journey of a middle-aged, gay man dealing with the death of his mother. The novel received the 2007 Stonewall Book Award.

Plot
The narrative takes place in a predominantly gay neighborhood in Washington D.C. near the famous Dupont Circle. The story focuses on the exploits of a middle-aged, gay man who has recently moved to the city after the death of his mother. The novel follows this protagonist as he goes through the grieving process, holding true to the belief our deceased loved ones stay with us forever, or at least as long as we continue to grieve for them.

Considering the novel's exploration of the complex and highly personal emotion of grief the title seems simple, yet remains effective. The protagonist convinces himself the emotion has become one of the major aspects of his life as a survivor. In essence, he lives to grieve both his mother and the numerous gay friends he lost during the 1980s AIDS epidemic. Characters frequently debate grief at various instances. Some of these individuals find the emotion unnecessary baggage. The protagonist refuses to accept this argument; he feels strongly that grief provides a crucial link between the living and the dead.

The novel opens with a first-person narrator, a nameless, middle-aged, gay man. He has decided to take a teaching position in Washington D.C. He starts his journey waiting for his flight during a layover in Atlanta. Sitting in the departure lounge, he can’t help but think about his late mother. He reminisces how his life used to revolve around her when she was terminally ill. He remembers how he lacked any serious social life because he would spend every weekend with her after picking her up from the nursing home. After she passed, he realized a change in scenery was in order. His life in Florida had become hollow and depressing.

The narrator arrives at his new residence on N Street N.W. to discover his landlord and future roommate is out of town. He has mixed emotions about having the new house to himself on his arrival. He enjoys the solitude, but feels a bit lonely. He takes time to observe the furniture, art work, and architecture of his new residence, as well as the exteriors of the other residential buildings throughout the neighborhood. Overall, he rather likes his new environment.

During his first night in the house he comes across a book in his room entitled, Mary Todd Lincoln: Her Life and Letters. The work consists of numerous letters written by the former first lady after the death of her husband. The narrator relates deeply to the grief Mary Todd Lincoln expresses throughout the pages of the text. After her husband died, she no longer had a stable home; she simply wandered the world in a permanent state of mourning. The narrator continuously reads this book throughout the novel; comparing Mary Todd Lincoln's suffering to that of his own. During his first few days alone in the house, he encounters numerous interesting locals around N Street. He meets a homeless man who works as a con-artist, telling people he needs money to take his nonexistent wife to the hospital. He also notices the handsome, yet reclusive, military veteran who cleans leaves off the sidewalk and receives helpful advice from the homosexual couple who live in the townhouse beneath him.

The landlord soon returns from his business trip and introduces himself to the narrator. Similar to the protagonist, this character also remains nameless. The landlord is also gay, middle-aged, and currently single. The two men acquaint themselves and discuss current events taking place in the city. Apparently, a racial schism has broken out between blacks and whites after the mistreatment of a local African American politician. The narrator realizes he has picked a very tumultuous time to move to the nation's capitol.

After getting settled, the narrator decides to visit his friend, Frank, who recommended him for the teaching position. Frank is also gay; however, he behaves far more flagrantly than the narrator or the landlord. During their visit the two discuss the death of the narrator's mother and the hardship of living as middle-aged gay men. Frank also mentions he has a new boyfriend, a handsome and muscular young man he refers to as the Lug. Desperate for the two of them to meet, Frank suggests the three of them should go out to a movie. The narrator declines, explaining he would rather explore the more intellectual aspects of his new city. Over the next couple of weeks he peruses the numerous museums and evening concerts Washington D.C. has to offer. He enjoys the cultural experience, but regrets having to do it alone. Walking through the streets alone at night tends to remind him of the grief he feels about his mother.

One morning, after the landlord has left for work, the narrator discovers the man keeps his dog, Biscuit, cooped up in the study all day. He opens the door in hopes that the dog will come out, only to realize the animal enjoys her confinement. The narrator begins liberating the dog from the study on a regular basis and grows fond of her company. He keeps this secret from the landlord, worried it will upset the man.

As the days turn to months, the narrator and his landlord develop a platonic friendship with one another. They share meals together and frequently discuss the local gay community. The landlord reveals himself to be a very popular individual on N Street. Unfortunately, personal issues have driven him to leave his previous social life behind. He admits to having been romantically involved with a member of the gay couple living beneath them. The relationship ended badly and the landlord finds it difficult to socialize while his ex-lover lives happily with another man. Nevertheless, the landlord continues to post personal ads in the local newspaper with the hope of attracting a new boyfriend.

With time the narrator grows comfortable in his teaching position at the local university. His course focuses on literature specifically relating to homosexuality. He decides to reference the Mary Todd Lincoln book by comparing the assassination of Abraham Lincoln to the homosexual AIDS epidemic of the 1980s. This analogy angers one of his students, who viciously argues gays had a choice while Lincoln did not. The narrator proceeds to end the discussion by stating that “AIDS is dead,” considering it was primarily a homosexual disease, which will never impact the remaining population on such a high level. Few middle-age American homosexuals exist as a result of the 1980s epidemic. Such thoughts remind him of the numerous gay friends he lost to the virus. Just for living through the decade, he feels very much like a survivor. The narrator realizes he harbors a great deal of grief not just for his late mother, but for the many gay friends he lost during the 1980s.

A few days later, the narrator encounters the belligerent student at the Metropolitan Museum. The student explains he takes the discussion of AIDS personally, because he had a gay brother who died from the virus. Their parents were appalled by their son's homosexuality, so he tended to his dying brother alone. The student quickly excuses himself, but leaves the narrator with many thoughts about his deceased gay friends and the choices they had made.

One day while liberating Biscuit from the study, the narrator comes across a photo album. Flipping through the pages he notices his landlord knew his late friend, Nick. The two discuss their mutual friend in detail. Nick was a beautiful young man who the narrator had known in New York City several years ago. Nick was one of the many AIDS victims during the 1980s. The landlord explains that Nick's mother lives alone in Washington, not far from their house. The narrator pays her a visit and the two end up spending the day together. Over dinner, the two discuss grief and the impact it has had on both of their lives. In the end, they both agree mourning for lost loved ones remains one of the most human qualities on earth.

As spring approaches, the narrator's teaching position ends and he prepares for his departure. Both his landlord and Frank encourage him to stay in Washington, assuring him the transition would be beneficial. Nevertheless, the narrator feels he must return to his house in Florida. He still has emotional issues he needs to deal with before he can truly move on with his life.

Shortly before leaving, the narrator confesses to Frank he had lied to his mother about his sexual orientation. Allowing his mother to die ignorant of his homosexuality fills him with the grief he carries everyday of his life. Upon returning to his Florida home he finds the grief to be overwhelming. He turns to pray in a hope God will bless the spirits of his deceased father and mother.

Characters in "Grief"
Narrator - The novel's main character is a nameless middle-aged homosexual who has recently lost his mother. He moves to Washington DC to start his life over again and begins teaching a class about AIDS at a local university. During his stay, he examines his surroundings and uses them to provide insight into his own life experience. Throughout his stay in Washington, the narrator reflects on his views on grief. A prevailing thought he seems to cling to is that grief is a way of keeping your loved ones with you and maintaining a connection with them. The narrator fears that if he moves past his grief, he will no longer have a relationship with the dead and will lose the intimacy he developed with the deceased while they were alive.

Landlord - The narrator's landlord is a nameless, handsome, middle-aged homosexual who pointedly maintains a distance between his tenant and himself. Upon meeting him, the narrator states that “he reminded me of an older America that had never changed its values of thrift, cleanliness, and order” (39). The landlord seems to have given up on life and on finding a significant other and often makes discouraging, negative remarks to the narrator when the narrator suggests attending particular social events. At one point, the narrator observes that “at fifty-five things had stopped happening to him... or rather: Everything that did happen to him had happened before--many, many times” (393).

Frank - Frank is a sarcastic yet insightful friend of the narrator. He seeks to help the narrator overcome his grief and move on with his life. While the narrator argues that grief maintains a dead person's “presence on earth” (18), Frank argues that regardless of whether or not you grieve for the deceased, they are gone and there is no bringing them back. He helps the narrator interpret the actions of his landlord and also assists him in understanding the narrator's own emotions, his relationship with his mother, his need to be needed, even his relationship with his landlord's dog. Towards the end of the novel, it is revealed that Frank has cancer, and that his days are numbered.

Nick's Mother - Nick's mother (nameless)  was a mutual friend of the narrator and the narrator's landlord. She and the narrator trade their individual views on grief and reminisce about her son, who died of AIDS several years prior. While the narrator seems to harbor more romantic views on grief and the dead, Nick's mother entertains a more scientific view, which is illustrated when she states that “when we die, our bodies and brains have stopped. Hence there is no consciousness. Hence we cannot wake up. It's merely a false extrapolation people want to make because they cannot bare the thought of their own extinction” (117).

Nick - Nick is  a mutual friend of the narrator and the narrator's landlord. Nick believed strongly in the power of the mind to alter one's individual reality and learnt Silva Mind Control and how to walk on hot coals. He put a lot of energy into maintaining a healthy body, for example, he stayed out of the sun and only drank bottled water. Since he died of AIDS at an early age, the narrator views his work on his mind and body as futile.

Narrator's Mother - The narrator's mother is recently deceased and spent the last part of her life in a nursing home where her son would often visit her. She and the narrator developed an especially intimate relationship during her final years and the narrator continues to actively grieve for her throughout the novel.

Biscuit - Biscuit is the landlord's neglected dog and is often compared to the narrator's mother and is later compared to the narrator himself.

Mary Todd Lincoln - Throughout the novel, the narrator reads the letters of Mary Todd Lincoln and her story exerts great influence on him and his views on grief. In particular, the narrator is interested in the way Lincoln reacts to the deaths of her loved ones. After her husband died, Lincoln seemed to believe “that any attempt to be happy was beside the point, since she was only waiting to be reunited with her husband and children in the afterlife” (68). At one point the narrator states that “the letters of Mrs. Lincoln were starting to be the reference for everything [he] noticed” (68). He is fascinated with her, and her personal story is an integral part of his.

Washington D.C. - The narrator often analyzes the history and character of Washington D.C. throughout the novel.  At one point, the narrator remarks that Washington is “the perfect city for grief: like walking through a cemetery” (66).  In many ways, he has a more intimate relationship with the city than he does with individuals.

Major Themes

Struggles and Hardships
This novel exemplifies the struggles and hardships of being gay and living in society at the same time. The narrator alludes to this during the course of his thoughts. He feels as though the world and society misconstrue what it actually means to be gay. According to everyone else, their life does not define normal. Being in Washington D.C., within a gay community, the narration shows how the hardship can only be mitigated if one surrounds one's self with similar people. The narrator, unable to come to terms with being gay, cannot openly display his preferences and has subsequent actions in reaction to this feeling. He goes to gay clubs but makes sure that he is inconspicuous; therefore people will not think he is a regular. Another subject brought up is the guilt he feels when he does not tell his mother that he is actually a homosexual, even when she blatantly asked it of him before she died. He feels guilt and despair when realizing his mother “had the misfortune to become dependent on a child who was a closeted homosexual, who had kept his real life from her for years, so that when he took care of her there was nothing but him and her – no life, no family of his own, nothing but his own solitude” (121). The narrator clearly explains that he feels like he causes the death of his mother because he was filled with despair of not being able to come to terms with being an openly homosexual person.

The narrator, a professor at a local college, has a conversation one day with a student, trying to explain the difficulties concerning gays and wanting love and companionship. Frank concludes that gays are no different from regular humans by saying that the reason why homosexuals are so promiscuous is because “they were looking for love... [and] they thought they could get love from sex” (77). The student responds by stating that sex gave them AIDS and that “they should have known” better than to have sex promiscuously.  The situation introduces confusion outsiders are often met with when trying to understand the gay culture. The student does not understand the thought process of homosexuals, who are only looking for love and life as any regular human desire. The student exemplifies the idea of society unable to accept and understand homosexuals, which is brings about the inability to accept gay culture. The idea of struggling to come to terms and the hardships of being able to be free to display sexual preferences within society are prevalent through the narrator and his actions.

Mortality of a Middle Aged Man
The theme of middle aged morality also come into play within the novel. As being survivors of the AIDS epidemic, the narrator, Frank and the landlord feel a sense of guilt and grief of out surviving many their common friends and lovers. Because of this, it prevents the narrator and the landlord ability to form healthy relationships with other men, because they are scarred from the hurt. The landlord spends a majority of the story putting ads into newspapers and blind dating many men who always turn out to be much too young and never looking for commitment. The explanation for wanting to put in ad in to the personal is stated by Frank. “Now we realize we’re not looking for sex anymore – we’re looking for fidelity. Tenderness! Intimacy! And that’s why he’s going to put an ad in the Personals” (55). The combination of out surviving many good friends has put the landlord at a struggle because he no longer knows where to look, to find older men that are his age. Many of them died from AIDS during the epidemic or continually look toward younger men who will satisfy their needs without the threat of commitment. This chronic loneliness that both the narrator and the landlord suffer through creates unrest among the two of them. Their only desire is to live their lives with someone to serve as company and love.

Loss of a Loved One
During the course of the novel, the concept of stages of grief is introduced. The stages are denial, anger, depression, and acceptance. The narrator, as well as other characters in the story, slowly passes through these stages in trying to deal with death.

Premature Death
During the story, the theme of dealing with grief overcomes the narrator, the landlord and Frank. Premature death grief results from the guilt that they try to deal with because of the AIDS epidemic. Many of their friends, for example one named Nick is overcome by the disease. When told about his HIV, Nick “looked like a deer caught in a car’s headlights for weeks... he even chased the doctor who had given him the news into a grocery store...one day and stood there in Produce screaming at him that he was wrong” (115). The idea of dealing with someone who should not have died is something that all of the homosexual men have to deal with because of AIDS. Along with not wanting to deal with the actual past events, they also become angered and depressed. The narrator explains the idea of trying to accept the death of someone who was not supposed to die. “Our age, our solitary status, the fact that we had survived something so many friends of ours had not... was one reason no doubt I simply walked around the halls but never touched a human being: the presence of the dead” (73). The sense of grief that they feel is one in which they are guilty, bearing down the weight of something that should have happened to them, but rather it did not. In that way, their grief remains constant, unable to be forgotten or to be accepted fully.

Another example of this idea of grief is introduced by to the narrator. A student one day, while in a museum, explains to the narrator that his brother had died of AIDS. He tries to rationalize the fact that the person who died would want others to move on. “My brother would have wanted me to, I’m sure of that. My brother loved life. That’s why he got killed” (102). While the student seems to be able to rationalize and come to terms with a premature death, the narrator and the landlord seem to be unable to withdraw themselves from the situation in which was almost their own fate. They happened to be the lucky ones, and this trait to not have died from AIDS, while so many others did is the guilt they hold within themselves.

Family Member Death
The biggest theme in the story is one about the death of a family member. The narrator's mother is the single reason why he takes a visit to Washington D.C. in order to try to work through the grief of losing his mother. Being the sole caretaker of his mother, he feels as though he “kept her alive longer than she wanted to be” because “families often hang on to [them] because they cannot let them go” (122). Grief, in this sense, is an overwhelming feeling of loss and despair, because the depression one goes through by not having someone they love around anymore as well the inability to accept death as a natural course of life. In order to work through his despair, the narrator finds ways in order to lessen the pain and to transfer some of the guilt he is feeling. He turns to roaming around Washington D.C. and conversing with his friend, Frank that “there are a lot of people who never get over certain things” like grief for example. “The past becomes their home. The dead become more real to them than the living – because there are more of the dead. They miss the dead, and when that happens, life stops” (21). This explanation perfects the theme of death of a family member. It helps to describe what happens when grief overpowers one's emotions and the reasons why one cannot overcome the death of a person.

This is also a prevalent situation when the narrator parallels his life to that of Mary Todd Lincoln and Henry Adams. Throughout the story, while reading the diary of Mary Todd Lincoln, titled Mary Todd Lincoln: Her Life and Letters, the narrator makes connections between his grief and that of which Mary Todd Lincoln went through when her husband, Abraham Lincoln, was assassinated.  Mary Todd Lincoln “grieved till she died – in a more ostentatious manner – who, you might say, tried to move on and couldn’t” (20). Henry Adams, who had to deal with the suicide of his wife, went through a similar situation. He tried to move on with his life “but when someone asked him to speak to a historical society years later, he turned and said, ‘But didn’t you know? I’ve been dead for fifteen years” (86). Both Henry Adams and Mary Todd Lincoln felt as if their life was cut short when their loved ones died without them. These feelings mirror what the narrator feels when his mother dies. With the guilt and the despair of missing his mother, the narrator feels as though his life is gone as well, even if he still is physically living. He wonders within his head one day while teaching if “[the students] will look up across the table and discover that their teacher is also dead” (75). The idea that grief overtakes someone's life is the common theme as seen with the example of the narrator, Mary Todd Lincoln and Henry Adams. Grief comes to be the idea that one cannot overcome the idea of living without someone they love because “after someone you love dies, you are homeless, really, because your home was once with them” (142). This theme is the overpowering theme and motif throughout the story.

Literary significance and reception
Holleran's novel, Grief, had a great initial reception among gay literature critics. Even popular critics praised Grief for its craftsmanship and the intense themes it evokes within the story. For example, "Andrew Holleran's novel Grief could be to fiction what Joan Didion's best-selling 2005 memoir, The Year of Magical Thinking, was to non-fiction: A hit about how we consciously and unconsciously cope with the death and absence of someone we love. Grief, like The Year of Magical Thinking, is tempting to read in one sitting. Instead, it should be savored, because its emotional theme and elegiac tone are mesmerizing."

"The parallels between Griefs emotionally immured protagonist and Mary Lincoln, ravaged and ultimately destroyed by grief over her husband's death, are evident but not overplayed. And the narrator's decision as to how to live the remainder of his life seems as etched in stone as the words he reads on the city's monuments. Still, in the end, Holleran's moving novel is mostly about human resilience and hope; our enduring need to love, despite our losses. The beautiful life is brief: all the more reason to embrace it."

by Elizabeth Hand  (Washington Post)

"It is a testament to Holleran’s extraordinary skill that out of such mundane details he has assembled a story resonant with the tragedies of three American centuries. Grief captures the heartbreak of a generation-plus of gay men, men now well advanced in middle age, many of whom after the carnage of the plague can scarcely believe that they themselves are still alive."

by Lewis Gannet  (Gay and Lesbian Review Worldwide)

"Holleran handles a sensitive topic with nuance and care, peppering his narrative with discriminating observations about sex, love, life, death - and grief. Whether your husband is assassinated beside you as you sit watching a third-rate play or whether you are infected in a moment of sexual passion by a fatal virus, life has way of suddenly flipping so that you can end up dying internally, even spiritually, while still being physically alive."

by Michael Leonard  (Curled Up With a Good Book)

Allusions and References

Allusions to Other Works
Mary Todd Lincoln: Her Life and Letters by Justin and Linda Levitt Turner (references made throughout the novel)
Green Mansions by W. H. Hudson (79)
Capital Losses by James W. Goode (25)
The Day Kennedy Was Shot by Jim Bishop (42)
The Island by Athol Fugard (48)
Architectural Digest (6)
The Invasion of the Body Snatchers (57)Sculptures'''Boy With a Thorn (6, 49, 94)Isle of the Dead by Arnold Böcklin (66) (painting)Repose'' by John Singer Sargent (96) (painting)

Allusions to Actual History, Geography and Current Science
The novel references the 1980s AIDS epidemic and the post-AIDS crisis, which play a significant role in the novel. The novel also references historical events such as the assassination of President Lincoln and the death of Marian Adams, wife of Henry Adams.

The novel takes place in Washington D.C. and references famous locations such as Dupont Circle, Lafayette Square, the National Gallery, George Washington University Hospital, and the Congressional Cemetery on Capitol Hill. The novel also mentions less famous locales such as N Street and Sixteenth Street.

The novel references current theories on animal psychology such as the concept that gossip is actually a way in which humans bond with one another, comparable to the social grooming chimpanzees practice in order to form bonds with individuals in their population.

Awards and nominations
 2007 Stonewall Book Award for Literature.

Publication history
 2006, United States, Hyperion , Pub date 6 June 2006, Paperback.

References

External links
 Grief: a Novel
 Mary Todd Lincoln: Her Life and Letters 
 USA Today
 Washington Post
 Gay and Lesbian Review Worldwide
 Curled Up With a Good Book

2006 American novels
Novels by Andrew Holleran
Novels set in Washington, D.C.
Stonewall Book Award-winning works
2000s LGBT novels
American LGBT novels
Novels with gay themes
2006 LGBT-related literary works